Morier is a surname, and may refer to:

 David Morier (1705?–1770), Anglo-Swiss painter 
 David Richard Morier (1784-1877), British diplomat
 Isaac Morier (1750-1817), British diplomat
 James Justinian Morier (1780–1849), British diplomat and author
 John Philip Morier (1776-1853), British diplomat
 Nicole Morier, American singer-songwriter
 Robert Morier (1826–1893), British diplomat
 William Morier (1790-1864), British naval officer